The Herald and News is a daily newspaper serving the city of Klamath Falls and Klamath County in the U.S. state of Oregon.  It also distributes east into Lake County. The General Manager is Joe Hudon and the editor is Gene Warnick.  The Herald and News is a 15,000-circulation daily with a staff of 27. The morning paper is published four days a week, skipping Mondays, Thursdays, and Saturdays.

History
The Evening Herald was founded in 1906 by Fred Cronemiller and his family, who later moved to Lakeview, Oregon. Wesley O. Smith and E. J. Murray purchased the paper in 1908, and expanded its size. By one account, Murray sold the paper to F. R. Soule in 1922; by another, after having bought Smith's share, he sold it to Bruce Dennis, who had an extensive history as a newspaper owner in the state, in 1926. The Klamath News launched in 1923. In 1927, Dennis purchased the News. He then sold both papers to Frank Jenkins, Ernest Gilstrap, and Eugene Kelty (all formerly of the Eugene Register; they formed an association known as the Southern Oregon Publishing Company) in 1932. Kelty soon withdrew.

The two papers were merged to form the Herald and News as a result of wartime newsprint rationing; the first issue of the combined publication was published June 1, 1942. The paper is now only five days a week, skipping Mondays and Saturdays.

Prior owner Pioneer News Group sold its papers to Adams Publishing Group in 2017.

References

1942 establishments in Oregon
Daily newspapers published in the United States
Klamath County, Oregon
Klamath Falls, Oregon
Newspapers published in Oregon
Oregon Newspaper Publishers Association
Newspapers established in 1942